The Budongo Forest in Uganda is northwest of the capital city Kampala on the way to Murchison Falls National Park, and is located on the escarpment northeast of Lake Albert. It is known for its former abundance of East African mahogany trees as well as being home to a population of chimpanzees. An exceptionally large mahogany tree is still found here, and is more than 80 meters tall and some 20 meters in circumference.

Setting and conservation
The area, situated between 1° 37 N - 2° 03 N and 31° 22 - 31° 46 E, is 435 km² in extent and is composed mainly of moist, medium-altitude, semi-deciduous forest, with patches of savanna and woodland. It covers a gently rolling landscape, sloping down to the East African Rift. Four streams, Waisoke, Sonso, Kamirambwa and Siba, drain the forest and flow into Lake Albert. Annual rainfall in the area is between 1200 and 2200 mm, the rainy season being from March - May and again from September - November, the dry season being December - February.

The nearest town is Masindi, and much of the land around the forest is given over to crops, dwellings and villages, placing continuous pressure on the forest margins, and leading to exploitation for building materials and bushmeat, the snares set by poachers causing mutilation of the chimpanzees and other animals. The mahogany trees that still remain are cut and removed by itinerant pit sawyers.

Wildlife
Recorded from Budongo are more than 360 bird species, some 290 butterflies, 130 moths, 465 trees, and 24 mammals, of which 9 are primates. Classified as a moist semi-deciduous medium-altitude forest, Budongo supports various species of tree, the most impressive being, large buttressed giant mahoganies that have been left unfelled and now stand up to 60m tall. The bird checklist includes 60 west or central African bird species known from fewer than five locations in East Africa. Yellow-footed flycatcher, often associated with ironwood trees, has not been recorded elsewhere in Uganda, while Ituri batis, lemon-bellied crombec, white-thighed hornbill, black-eared ground thrush and chestnut-capped flycatcher are known from only one other East African forest.

Chimpanzee tracking has become an activity popular with eco-tourists, necessitating behavioural guidelines for visitors in order to avoid undue disturbance of both animals and forest. Trails have been cut criss-crossing the forest, initially to ease access for research workers and since then used by Eco-tourists, forest animals and poachers.

Wildlife research
Vernon Reynolds first studied chimpanzees in this forest in 1962 and he eventually founded the Budongo Conservation Field Station. He wrote a book about the forest and its chimpanzees in 1965. Reynolds was one of a trio of pioneer field researchers - the others being Jane Goodall and Adriaan Kortlandt. During the 1970s and 1980s civil war raged in the country, with an accompanying breakdown of law and order. Chimpanzee mothers were shot and the infants taken from the forest and smuggled to collectors in Asia, Europe and America. Reynolds returned to Uganda in 1990 to determine whether a viable population of chimpanzees still existed in Budongo. By 1995 some fifty individuals had been identified, and this figure remained constant until 2000 when the numbers started rising, thought to be due to an influx of chimpanzees from other areas.

The research team renovated and occupied buildings that had been constructed for the Budongo Sawmills Ltd. In 2005 funding for the project was provided by the RZSS at Edinburgh Zoo, as well as a number of other sources. The Budongo Forest Project became a Ugandan NGO and was renamed the Budongo Conservation Field Station.

Richard Byrne, Cat Hobaiter and colleagues have been based at the Field Station to studying chimpanzee communication in the twenty-first century.

See also
 Central Forest Reserves of Uganda

References

Forests of Uganda
Forest reserves of Uganda
Victoria Basin forest–savanna mosaic